Rubana Huq (born 9 February 1964) is a Bangladeshi businesswoman, university academic and poet. She is the current Vice-chancellor of Asian University for Women (AUW) since February 2022. She is the chairperson of Mohammadi Group, a Bangladeshi conglomerate. She was featured in BBC 100 Women in 2013 and 2014. She was elected as the first female president of BGMEA served during 2019–2021.

Early life and education
Huq was born on 9 February in 1964 in Dhaka in the then East Pakistan (now Bangladesh). She was educated at Viqarunnisa Noon School and Holy Cross College. She completed her master's in English literature from East West University in 2008 and PhD from Jadavpur University in 2018.

Career
From 1995 to 2017, Huq served as managing director of the Mohammadi Group, a conglomerate founded by her husband, Annisul Huq. In 2017, she became chairperson of the group following Annisul' death.  She served as the CEO of TV Southasia from 2006 to 2010. In 2019, she became the first woman elected president of the Bangladesh Garment Manufacturers and Exporters Association (BGMEA). Huq serves on the boards of the BGMEA, the UNFCCC fashion charter, the Asian University for Women (AUW), and Gono Sahajjo Shangstha (GSS). On 15 February 2022, Huq became the Vice-chancellor of AUW.

Awards and recognitions
Huq was recognized in the BBC 100 Women series in 2013 and 2014. In 2014, she was awarded the DHL-Daily Star Bangladesh Business Award for "Outstanding Business Women of The Year".

Personal life
Huq was married to Annisul Huq until his death in 2017. She has three children, Navidul Huq, Wamiq Umaira, and Tanisha Fariaman Huq.

References

External links
 
 
 
 

Living people
1964 births
Jadavpur University alumni
Bangladeshi businesspeople
BBC 100 Women
Bangladeshi women poets
Bangladeshi women academics
21st-century Bangladeshi poets